Tak Toyoshima (born April 11, 1971, in New York, New York) is an American art director with the Weekly Dig and the author of the comic strip Secret Asian Man.

According to an interview with AArisings, Toyoshima is a second-generation Japanese American born in New York City. He received a degree in advertising from Boston University, and currently resides in Boston.

External links

 Secret Asian Man home page
 United Media home page
 Interview with AARising.com

1971 births
American comic strip cartoonists
American people of Japanese descent
Artists from New York City
Boston University alumni
Living people